Oijärvi is a medium-sized lake of northern Finland in the Kuivajoki main catchment area. It is located in the Northern Ostrobothnia region and Ii municipality. A big part of the lake belongs to the Natura 2000 protection program due to its good environment for birds.

See also
List of lakes in Finland

References

Natura 2000 in Finland
Geography of North Ostrobothnia
Lakes of Ii